The 2000 Liverpool Victoria UK Championship was a professional ranking snooker tournament that took place at the Bournemouth International Centre in Bournemouth, England. The event started on 18 November 2000 and the televised stages were shown on BBC between 25 November and 3 December 2000. Nick Dyson made a maximum break in the qualifying stage against Robert Milkins.

John Higgins won in the final 10–4 against Mark Williams.

This was to be the last UK Championship to be held in Bournemouth, where the event was hosted since the 1998. From 2001 onwards it was hosted in York.

Tournament summary
Defending champion and World Champion Mark Williams was the number 1 seed. The remaining places were allocated to players based on the world rankings.

Prize money
The breakdown of prize money for this year is shown below:
 Winner: £78,000
 Runner-up: £41,000
 Total: £440,000

Main draw

Final

Qualifying

Round of 160  Best of 9 frames

 Mehmet Husnu 5–1 Sean Storey 

 Wayne Jones 5–2 Ryan Day 

 Mike Hallett 5–3 Lee Spick 

 Barry Pinches 5–4 Joe Jogia 

 Nick Dyson 5–0 Alan Burnett 

 Darryn Walker 5–4 Jeff Cundy 

 Simon Bedford w/o–w/d Da Hailin 

 Somporn Kanthawung 5–3 Stephen Maguire 

 Stuart Mann 5–0 Lasse Munstermann 

 Richard King 5–4 Scott MacKenzie 

 Barry Mapstone 5–3 Matt Wilson 

 Patrick Delsemme 5–3 Neil Robertson 

 Graham Lee 5–4 Bob Chaperon 

 Anthony Bolsover 5–1 Mark Bennett 

 Joe Delaney 5–3 Wayne Saidler 

 Philip Williams 5–4 Charoen Phorat 

 Jason Barton 5–3 Chris Shade 

 Stefan Mazrocis 5–4 Eddie Manning 

 Craig Harrison 5–1 Craig Roper 

 Hugh Abernethy 5–2 Karl Burrows 

 James Reynolds 5–3 Paul McPhilips 

 Jason Weston 5–1 Mario Wehrmann 

 Mark Selby 5–3 Ian Brumby 

 Bjorn Haneveer 5–2 Peter McCullagh 

 Stuart Reardon 5–1 Farhan Mirza 

 Barry Hawkins 5–4 Colm Gilcreest 

 Andrew Higginson 5–4 Noppadon Noppachorn 

 Robin Hull 5–3 Gareth Chilcott 

 David McLellan 5–4 Lee Richardson 

 David McDonnell 5–3 Nick Terry 

 Munraj Pal 5–1 Tony Knowles 

 Troy Shaw 5–1 Craig Butler 

Round of 128  Best of 9 frames

 Mehmet Husnu 5–3 Ali Carter 

 Leigh Griffin 5–1 Wayne Jones 

 Mike Hallett 5–0 Stephen O'Connor 

 Barry Pinches 5–2 Mick Price 

 Nick Dyson 5–3 Robert Milkins 

 Darryn Walker 5–0 Craig MacGillivray 

 Mark Gray 5–4 Simon Bedford 

 Somporn Kanthawung 5–0 Steve Judd 

 Mike Dunn 5–2 Stuart Mann 

 Richard King 5–4 Dean Reynolds 

 Adrian Gunnell 5–2 Barry Mapstone 

 Patrick Delsemme 5–1 Phaitoon Phonbun 

 Neal Foulds 5–1 Graham Lee 

 Tony Jones 5–4 Anthony Bolsover 

 Shokat Ali 5–2 Joe Delaney 

 Philip Williams 5–0 Leo Fernandez 

 Jason Barton 5–0 Dene O'Kane 

 Mark Fenton 5–2 Stefan Mazrocis 

 Craig Harrison w/o–w/d Martin Clark 

 Jason Prince 5–2 Hugh Abernethy 

 James Reynolds 5–1 Darren Clarke 

 Jason Weston 5–1 Tony Chappel 

 Kristján Helgason 5–4 Mark Selby 

 Bjorn Haneveer 5–3 Nick Walker 

 Stuart Reardon 5–2 Wayne Brown 

 Barry Hawkins 5–3 John Lardner 

 Andrew Higginson 5–1 Willie Thorne 

 Robin Hull 5–2 Paul Sweeny 

 David McLellan 5–2 Mark Davis 

 Nick Pearce 5–3 David McDonnell 

 Karl Broughton 5–3 Munraj Pal 

 Martin Dziewialtowski 5–3 Troy Shaw 

Round of 96  Best of 9 frames

 Mehmet Husnu 5–3 Ian McCulloch 

 Rod Lawler 5–4 Leigh Griffin 

 Jamie Burnett 5–4 Mike Hallett 

 Barry Pinches 5–3 Lee Walker 

 Nick Dyson 5–1 Paul Davies 

 Peter Lines 5–2 Darryn Walker 

 Mark Gray 5–3 Joe Johnson 

 Alfie Burden 5–3 Somporn Kanthawung 

 Anthony Davies 5–2 Mike Dunn 

 Gerard Greene 5–2 Richard King 

 Adrian Gunnell 5–4 Steve James 

 Patrick Delsemme 5–4 Alain Robidoux 

 Neal Foulds 5–2 Gary Ponting 

 Tony Jones 5–3 Stuart Pettman 

 Shokat Ali 5–4 Michael Holt 

 Jimmy Michie 5–4 Philip Williams 

 Bradley Jones 5–3 Jason Barton 

 Mark Fenton 5–4 John Read 

 Michael Judge 5–2 Craig Harrison 

 Jason Prince 5–1 Jason Ferguson 

 Jonathan Birch 5–2 James Reynolds 

 Paul Wykes 5–1 Jason Weston 

 Kristján Helgason 5–3 Euan Henderson 

 Bjorn Haneveer 5–3 Marcus Campbell 

 Stuart Bingham 5–2 Stuart Reardon 

 Barry Hawkins 5–3 Andy Hicks 

 Andrew Higginson 5–4 David Roe 

 Patrick Wallace 5–1 Robin Hull 

 Dave Finbow 5–3 David McLellan 

 Nick Pearce 5–4 Matthew Couch 

 David Gray 5–2 Karl Broughton 

 Gary Wilkinson 5–2   Martin Dziewialtowski 

Round of 64  Best of 11 frames

 Rod Lawler 6–5 Mehmet Husnu 

 Barry Pinches 6–4 Jamie Burnett 

 Nick Dyson 6–4 Peter Lines 

 Mark Gray 6–2 Alfie Burden 

 Gerard Greene 6–5 Anthony Davies 

 Adrian Gunnell 6–4 Patrick Delsemme 

 Neal Foulds 6–2 Tony Jones 

 Jimmy Michie 6–1 Shokat Ali 

 Bradley Jones 6–4 Mark Fenton 

 Michael Judge 6–4 Jason Prince 

 Jonathan Birch 6–4 Paul Wykes 

 Kristján Helgason 6–5 Bjorn Haneveer 

 Stuart Bingham 6–2 Barry Hawkins 

 Patrick Wallace 6–1 Andrew Higginson 

 Dave Finbow 6–4 Nick Pearce 

 David Gray 6–2 Gary Wilkinson

References

2000
UK Championship
Championship (snooker)
UK Championship
UK Championship